Krasny Ostrov is a rural locality (a settlement) in Chernyansky District, Belgorod Oblast, Russia. The population was 865 as of 2010. There are 13 streets.

Geography 
Krasny Ostrov is located 5 km west of Chernyanka (the district's administrative centre) by road. Chernyanka is the nearest rural locality.

References 

Rural localities in Chernyansky District